Montmorency is a provincial electoral district in the Capitale-Nationale region of Quebec, Canada.  It comprises part of the Beauport borough of Quebec City and the municipality of Sainte-Brigitte-de-Laval.

It was created for the 1867 election (and an electoral district of that name existed earlier in the Legislative Assembly of the Province of Canada and the Legislative Assembly of Lower Canada).

In the change from the 2001 to the 2011 electoral map, it lost much of its territory to the new electoral district of Charlevoix–Côte-de-Beaupré.

It was named after François de Laval the first Roman Catholic bishop in New France.

Members of the Legislative Assembly / National Assembly

Election results

|}

^ Change is from redistributed results. CAQ change is from ADQ.

|-
 
|Liberal
|Raymond Bernier
|align="right"|9,124
|align="right"|22.62
|align="right"|

References

External links
Information
 Elections Quebec

Election results
 Election results (National Assembly)

Maps
 2011 map (PDF)
 2001 map (Flash)
2001–2011 changes (Flash)
1992–2001 changes (Flash)
 Electoral map of Capitale-Nationale region
 Quebec electoral map, 2011

Provincial electoral districts of Quebec City
Montmorency